is a town located in Kamikawa Subprefecture, Hokkaido, Japan.

As of September 2016, the town has an estimated population of 11,053 and a density of 47 persons per km2. The total area is 237.18 km2.

Culture

Mascot

She is a 17-year-old idol pig. Her clothes is scented with lavender. She likes to eat stuff that taste good (such as kiki pork, a type of tonkatsu) and enjoys hot springs scented with lavender. When she is on her break from idoling, she makes potpourri bags and gardening. Her favourite colours are pink and purple. She struggles with dieting, being around narrow places and heights but as an idol, she can overcome them. Per idol tradition, she is forbidden from making any romantic feelings. Her quote is "pure, correct and beautiful" (清く　正しく　美しく). Her birthday is July 28.

Climate

Sister city

The town of Kamifurano has a sister city in Canada:
 Camrose, Alberta, Canada

References

External links

Official Website 

Towns in Hokkaido